Leon Sales (October 4, 1923April 27, 1981) was an American stock car racing driver. Sales competed in 8 NASCAR Grand National races from 1950 to 1952. He achieved 3 top tens and 1 win, which came at North Wilkesboro Speedway in 1950. Sales died on April 27, 1981 and is buried at Crestview Memorial Park in Forsyth County, North Carolina alongside his wife Eirleen.

Motorsports career results

NASCAR
(key) (Bold – Pole position awarded by qualifying time. Italics – Pole position earned by points standings or practice time. * – Most laps led.)

Grand National Series

References

External links
 

1923 births
1981 deaths
NASCAR drivers
People from North Carolina
People from Winston-Salem, North Carolina